Don Bruce Diamont (born Donald Feinberg; December 31, 1962) is an American actor. His best known roles include Brad Carlton on The Young and the Restless and Bill Spencer Jr. on The Bold and the Beautiful. In 1990, Diamont was chosen as one of the 50 most beautiful people in the world by People Magazine, becoming the first daytime actor to receive the honor.

Career 
After several years as a successful model, Diamont's first major acting role was as Carlo Forenza on Days of Our Lives. He joined the cast in 1984 after being hired by Ken Corday, and was with the show for a year.

Diamont is best known for his portrayal of opportunistic businessman Brad Carlton on The Young and the Restless. He initially joined the show in 1985 and left the cast in 1996, but returned in 1998, remaining on the show until his character was killed off in early 2009.

On March 5, 2009 it was announced that Diamont would be joining the cast of the CBS daytime drama The Bold and the Beautiful in the contract role of Bill Spencer Jr. His first air date was May 12, 2009. "Don is a versatile actor with a vast range of talent," B&B's Executive Producer and Head Writer, Bradley Bell, said in a statement, "It is my pleasure to welcome him to B&B. He has also expressed an interest in being a script writer."

Diamont is also known for being the spokesperson for Morris Home Furnishings in Dayton, Ohio.

In 2006, Diamont was voted No. 1 on the Sexiest Soap Hunks of All Time list at the Shrine to the Soap Hunks.

Diamont was also a cover model for Playgirl magazine twice, in 1988 and 1995.

He is active with the National Multiple Sclerosis Society, and has a niece afflicted with the illness.

Don was named "Sexiest Veteran Soap Actor" by People Magazine in 2009.

He was in 1995's Sure Ultra Dry commercial campaign.

In 2018 he took part in the cast of the talent show conducted by Milly Carlucci, Ballando con le Stelle (the Italian adaptation of Strictly Come Dancing / Dancing with the Stars)

In 2021, Diamont announced that he would appear on The Young and the Restless as Bill Spencer Jr. in a crossover event and marking his return since Brad Carlton who is the previous cast after 12 years.

Personal life 
Diamont is the son of Judy (née Diamont; died 2006) and Albert Feinberg (died 1987). He has three siblings, two sisters Bette (died 1998) and Elena, and one brother, Jack (died 1989).

With his ex-wife Rachel Braun, he has four sons. Diamont married his long-time girlfriend Cindy Ambuehl in Eze, France on June 12, 2012. They are parents to twin boys. After her passing, Don also raised his late sister Bette's son and has counted him as a seventh child.

His son, Alexander, nicknamed Zander, played quarterback for the Indiana University football team.

His son, Luca, is a wide receiver for the Duke University football team.

Ethnicity 
Diamont began using his mother's maiden name when he began acting and modeling after an agent suggested that it was more "rhythmical," but in fact because it was less obviously Jewish-sounding.

In the August 15, 2006 edition of Soap Opera Digest, Diamont discusses his Jewish background and discloses that he did not fully embrace his Jewish heritage until later in life. Coincidentally, his storyline on The Young and the Restless (head written by Lynn Marie Latham & Scott Hamner) has paralleled his personal life in some ways. The show has revealed that the persona of "Brad Carlton" is actually "George Kaplan." (For dramatic purposes, the show has explained this by disclosing that George/Brad had to hide his past, and his Jewishness, for his own safety.)

Filmography

Film

Television

References

External links
 Soap opera character’s revelation matches actor’s personal journey Article comparing character Carlton's "coming out" as a Jew to Diamont's developing Judaism.
 Don Diamont Chats About B&B Role
 
 Don Diamont Q&A: On Leaving Y&R

1962 births
American male soap opera actors
American male television actors
Jewish American male actors
Living people
Male actors from New York City
21st-century American Jews